Leptocolpodes is a genus of ground beetles in the family Carabidae. There are about 12 described species in Leptocolpodes.

Species
These 12 species belong to the genus Leptocolpodes:

 Leptocolpodes bispinosus (Jeannel, 1948)  (Madagascar)
 Leptocolpodes corynoscitus (Basilewsky, 1960)  (South Africa)
 Leptocolpodes erythropus (Jeannel, 1951)  (Madagascar)
 Leptocolpodes leleupi (Basilewsky, 1950)  (Democratic Republic of the Congo, Kenya, and Uganda)
 Leptocolpodes leroyi (Burgeon, 1937)  (Democratic Republic of the Congo and Rwanda)
 Leptocolpodes mgetae (Basilewsky, 1962)  (Tanzania)
 Leptocolpodes overlaeti (Burgeon, 1937)  (Democratic Republic of the Congo and Ivory Coast)
 Leptocolpodes pictus (Basilewsky, 1970)  (Madagascar)
 Leptocolpodes subpictus Basilewsky, 1985  (Madagascar)
 Leptocolpodes suturifer (Csiki, 1931)  (South Africa)
 Leptocolpodes usambaranus (Alluaud, 1914)  (Tanzania)
 Leptocolpodes velox (Péringuey, 1898)  (South Africa)

References

Platyninae